The 310th Air Division is an inactive United States Air Force organization. Its last assignment was with Continental Air Command 's Twelfth Air Force at Tinker Air Force Base, Oklahoma, where it was inactivated on 27 June 1949.

The division was first activated as the 310th Bombardment Wing in New Guinea during World War II.  It served as a task force headquarters, commanding advanced elements of Fifth Air Force during the New Guinea campaign and the liberation of the Philippines.  After VJ Day, it moved to Japan, serving in the occupation forces until inactivating in March 1946.  The wing was again activated in the reserves in 1947, becoming a division the following year.

History

World War II
During World War II, the 310 Bombardment Wing, Medium was a command echelon of Fifth Air Force in the Southwest Pacific theater, controlling numerous fighter and bomber groups and squadrons until the Japanese surrender in 1945. Its attached units "flew missions against Japanese shipping, coastal installations, gun positions, airdromes, and troop concentrations. Fighting in New Guinea and later in the Philippine Islands, attached fighter units flew escort for bombing, supply, and reconnaissance missions." In October 1945, the wing moved to Japan and served in the occupation force.  It was inactivated in Japan during early 1946.

Air Force Reserve
The 310th Bombardment Wing was activated as a reserve unit under Air Defense Command (ADC) at Tinker Field, Oklahoma on 26 July 1947, but had no units assigned until September when the 323d Bombardment Group was activated at Tinker and assigned to the wing. The 177th AAF Base Unit (later the 2592d Air Force Reserve Training Center) supervised the training of reserve units at Tinker. Later that fall, at the end of October, the 340th Bombardment Group was activated at Tulsa Municipal Airport and assigned to the wing. Although the units were designated as bombardment units, it appeared they were equipped with North American AT-6 Texan and Beechcraft AT-11 aircraft only.

In 1948, when the regular Air Force implemented the wing base organization system, the wing, along with other multi-base reserve wings was redesignated as an air division. The same year, Continental Air Command assumed responsibility for managing reserve and Air National Guard units from ADC.

The 310th was inactivated when Continental Air Command reorganized its reserve units under the wing base organization system in June 1949. The division's personnel and equipment were transferred to the 323d Bombardment Wing, which was activated at Tinker the same day and assumed command of the 323d Bombardment Group. President Truman’s reduced 1949 defense budget also required reductions in the number of units in the Air Force, and the 340th Group was inactivated in August and not replaced as reserve flying operations at Tulsa ceased.

Lineage
 Established as the 310th Bombardment Wing, Medium on 20 January 1944
 Activated on 1 February 1944
 Inactivated on 25 March 1946
 Redesignated 310th Bombardment Wing, Light on 27 May 1947
 Activated in the Reserve on 26 July 1947
 Redesignated 310th Air Division, Bombardment on 16 April 1948
 Inactivated on 27 June 1949

Assignments
 Fifth Air Force, 1 February 1944 – 25 March 1946
 Tenth Air Force, 26 July 1947
 Fourteenth Air Force, 1 July 1948
 Twelfth Air Force, 12 January – 27 June 1949

Stations

 Gusap Airfield, New Guinea, 1 February 1944
 Hollandia, New Guinea, 6 May 1944
 Wama Drome, Morotai, Netherlands East Indies, 18 September 1944
 Bayug Airfield, Leyte, Philippines, 14 November 1944
 McGuire Field, Mindoro, Philippines, 15 December 1944
 Clark Field, Luzon, Philippines, 23 August 1945
 Itami Airfield, Japan, 21 October 1945 – 25 March 1946
 Tinker Field (later Tinker Air Force Base), Oklahoma, 26 July 1947 – 27 June 1949

Components

World War II
 Groups

 3d Bombardment Group: attached 1 May 1944 – September 1944; 15 January 1945 – 31 May 1946
 8th Fighter Group: attached c. 31 May 1944 – c. 25 March 1946
 18th Fighter Group: attached 24 March – 26 April 1945
 35th Fighter Group: attached 1 February – 1 August 1944, 2 October 1944 – 25 March 1946
 38th Bombardment Group: 19 October 1944 – c. 25 March 1946
 42d Bombardment Group: attached 3–14 September 1944, assigned 31 January – 25 March 1946
 49th Fighter Group: attached 1 February – 1 May 1944, 9 January – 29 May 1945, 25 September – 10 November 1945
 58th Fighter Group: attached 9 January – 7 April 1945
 71st Tactical Reconnaissance Group: attached 9 January – 10 November 1945
 90th Bombardment Group: attached 31 May – 3 September 1944; 15 January – 23 November 1945
 312th Bombardment Group: 31 May – 3 September 1944; 1 July – 13 October 1945
 348th Fighter Group: 1 May – 25 August 1944; 25 September 1945 – 25 March 1946
 375th Troop Carrier Group: 24 March – 9 August 1945
 380th Bombardment Group: c. 24 March 1945 – unknown
 417th Bombardment Group: 9 January – 1 November 1945
 475th Fighter Group: 14 May – 16 June 1944

 Squadrons

 3d Emergency Rescue Squadron: 9 January 1945 – unknown
 17th Photographic Reconnaissance Squadron: 29 May – 3 September 1944; c. 24 March – 3 April 1945
 25th Liaison Squadron: c. 15 January 1945 – unknown
 25th Photographic Reconnaissance Squadron: c. 9 January 1945 – unknown
 26th Photographic Reconnaissance Squadron: c. 1 July – 3 September 1944
 41st Troop Carrier Squadron: c. 17 May – 3 September 1944
 65th Troop Carrier Squadron: c. 15 January 1945 – unknown
 66th Troop Carrier Squadron: c. 15 January 1945 – unknown
 82d Tactical Reconnaissance Squadron: 9 January 1945 – unknown
 110th Reconnaissance Squadron (later 110th Tactical Reconnaissance Squadron): c. 1 February – 10 April 1944; c. 9 January 1945 – unknown
 318th Troop Carrier Squadron: c. 15 January 1945 – unknown
 418th Night Fighter Squadron: 15 May – 9 November 1944; 26 December 1944 – 30 January 1945; 22 October – 10 November 1945
 421st Night Fighter Squadron: c. 31 May – 3 September 1944
 547th Night Fighter Squadron: 9 January 1945 – unknown; 22 October – 10 November 1945

Air Force Reserve
 323d Bombardment Group: 9 September 1947 – 27 June 1949
 340th Bombardment Group; 31 October 1947 – 19 August 1949

Aircraft

 Douglas A-20 Havoc, 1944-c. 1945
 Douglas A-26 Invader, 1944-c. 1945
 Consolidated B-24 Liberator, 1944-c. 1945
 North American B-25 Mitchell, 1944-c. 1945
 Beechcraft C-43 Traveler, 1944-c. 1945
 Beechcraft C-45 Expeditor, 1944-c. 1945
 Lockheed F-5 Lightning, 1944-c. 1945
 Stinson L-5 Sentinel, 1944-c. 1946
 Lockheed P-38 Lightning, 1944-c. 1945
 Bell P-39 Airacobra, 1944-c. 1945
 Curtiss P-40 Warhawk, 1944-c. 1945
 Republic P-47 Thunderbolt, 1944-c. 1945
 Northrop P-61 Black Widow, 1944-c. 1945
 Douglas P-70 Havoc, 1944-c. 1945
 Curtiss C-46 Commando, c. 1945-c. 1946
 Douglas C-47 Skytrain, c. 1945-c. 1946
 Consolidated OA-10 Catalina, c. 1945-c. 1946
 North American P-51 Mustang, c. 1945-c. 1946.

Commanders

 Brig Gen Donald R. Hutchison, 1 February 1944
 Col John T. Murtha, 16 Oct 19448
 Col Jack A. Wilson, 15 December 1944
 Col William M. Morgan, 22 March 1945
 Col Jack A. Wilson, 17 July 1945
 Col William M. Morgan, 29 August 1945
 Col Othel R. Deering 16 December 1945 – unknown

See also
 List of United States Air Force air divisions

References

Notes

Bibliography

 
 
 
 

Air divisions of the United States Air Force